Nolan County is a county located in the west-central region of the U.S. state of Texas. As of the 2020 census, its population was 14,738. Its county seat is Sweetwater. The county was created in 1876 and organized in 1881. It is named for Philip Nolan, one of the first American traders to visit Texas. Nolan County comprises the Sweetwater micropolitan statistical area.

Geography

Nolan County is in the Cross Timbers region for wildlife management. Geologically Nolan County occupies part of the Rolling Plains in the North and South, separated by an isolated part of the Edwards Plateau in much of the center. The uplifted plateau, rising up to 500 feet above the surrounding plains, gives Nolan county an advantage on production of wind energy.

West of Highland School, the Bench Mountain, at 2607 feet above sea level, is listed as the highest point in Nolan County.

Plateau areas of the Cretaceous Period and much of the county are underlain by petroleum deposits from the Pennsylvanian Period.

Major highways
  Interstate 20
  U.S. Highway 84
  State Highway 70
  State Highway 153

Adjacent counties
 Fisher County (north)
 Taylor County (east)
 Runnels County (southeast)
 Coke County (south)
 Mitchell County (west)

Demographics

Note: the US Census treats Hispanic/Latino as an ethnic category. This table excludes Latinos from the racial categories and assigns them to a separate category. Hispanics/Latinos can be of any race.

As of the census of 2000,  15,802 people, 6,170 households, and 4,288 families resided in the county.  The population density was 17 people per square mile (7/km2).  The 7,112 housing units averaged 8/sq mi (3/km2).  The racial makeup of the county was 78.45% White, 4.68% Black or African American, 0.49% Native American, 0.24% Asian, 0.06% Pacific Islander, 14.02% from other races, and 2.07% from two or more races. About 28.04% of the population was Hispanic or Latino of any race.

Of the 6,170 households, 32.20% had children under 18 living with them, 53.00% were married couples living together, 12.60% had a female householder with no husband present, and 30.50% were not families. Around 27.10% of all households were made up of individuals, and 13.40% had someone living alone who was 65 or older.  The average household size was 2.48, and the average family size was 3.01.

In the county, the population was distributed as  27.10% under 18, 8.50% from 18 to 24, 25.40% from 25 to 44, 22.60% from 45 to 64, and 16.40% who were 65 or older.  The median age was 37 years. For every 100 females, there were 94.70 males.  For every 100 females age 18 and over, there were 91.70 males.

The median income for a household in the county was $26,209, and for a family was $32,004. Males had a median income of $28,674 versus $19,335 for females. The per capita income for the county was $14,077.  About 18.30% of families and 21.70% of the population were below the poverty line, including 29.50% of those under age 18 and 18.50% of those age 65 or over.

Wind power
Nolan County has established itself as a center for wind power generation. As of July 2008, Nolan County generated more wind energy than the entire state of California, and would have ranked sixth in the world for wind power generation if it were counted as its own country. In 2013, there were more than 13,000 operational wind turbines.

A branch of Texas State Technical College, near Sweetwater, offers the first community-college program for wind energy in Texas beginning in 2007. Wind energy investments in the county of about $3 billion since 1999 have resulted in about 1,330 direct wind-related jobs created in Nolan County alone (in 2009), with almost $18,000,000 in annual landowner royalties and over $12,000,000 in annual local school taxes (2007), and about $1.7 million more in county property taxes. The majority of investments come from Epplament Energy, E.ON, Invenergy, Lestis Private Capital Group, NextEra, and Lattner Energy.

Nolan County is a hub of the Public Utility Commission's $5 billion CREZ wind-energy transmission line expansion project in Texas.

Communities

Cities
 Blackwell (partly in Coke County)
 Roscoe
 Sweetwater (county seat)

Unincorporated communities
 Maryneal
 Nolan
 Hylton

Ghost towns
 Bitter Creek
 Wastella
 Decker ( active cemetery remaining )
 Divide (Slater's Chapel cemetery remaining)

Politics
Susan King has been since 2007 the Republican state representative from Nolan, as well as Jones and Taylor Counties.

See also

 List of museums in West Texas
 National Register of Historic Places listings in Nolan County, Texas
 Recorded Texas Historic Landmarks in Nolan County

References

External links
 Nolan County Official Site
 
 Nolan County Profile from the Texas Association of Counties
 The National WASP WWII Museum
 

 
1881 establishments in Texas
Populated places established in 1881
Micropolitan areas of Texas